A special election for Mississippi's 1st congressional district was held on May 12, 2015, to fill the term left by the vacancy created by the death of Alan Nunnelee. Nunnelee, a member of the Republican Party, died on February 6, 2015.

According to Mississippi state law, Governor Phil Bryant had to call the special election within 60 days of Nunnelee's death, and had to be held at least 60 days after the call. Prospective candidates had to submit a petition for ballot access consisting of at least 1,000 signatures of qualified Mississippi voters with the office of the Secretary of State of Mississippi at least 45 days before the election. 

The election was won by Republican Trent Kelly.

Election format
All candidates ran together on the same primary ballot, irrespective of party affiliation. As no candidate received a majority of the vote, a runoff was held on June 2 between Trent Kelly (R) and Walter Zinn (D), the top two finishers.

Candidates
 Note: Special elections in Mississippi are nonpartisan. Party identification is for informational purposes only.

Republican Party

Declared
 Boyce Adams, nominee for the Northern District of the Mississippi Public Service Commission in 2011
 Sam Adcock, businessman
 Nancy Adams Collins, state senator
 Ed "Doc" Holliday, dentist
 Starner Jones, emergency room physician
 Trent Kelly, (Lee, Pontotoc, Alcorn, Monroe, Itawamba, Prentiss and Tishomingo Counties)  District Attorney
 Chip Mills, Itawamba County Prosecutor
 Greg Pirkle, attorney and son of Estus Pirkle
 Henry Ross, former mayor of Eupora and candidate for the seat in 2010 and 2012
 Daniel Sparks, attorney
 Mike Tagert, Northern District Commissioner of the Mississippi Department of Transportation
 Quentin Whitwell, former Jackson City Councilman

Withdrew
 Chris Brown, state representative

Declined
 Lynn Fitch, Mississippi State Treasurer
 Merle Flowers, former state senator
 Tommy Irwin, mayor of Corinth
 Chip Johnson, mayor of Hernando
 James Maxwell, judge on the Mississippi Court of Appeals
 Brad Mayo, state representative
 Glenn McCullough, former mayor of Tupelo, former chairman of the Tennessee Valley Authority and candidate for the seat in 2008
 Mandy McGrevey Gunasekara, counsel for the United States Senate Committee on Environment and Public Works
 Joseph Murray, attorney and author
 Tori Nunnelee, widow of former Congressman Alan Nunnelee
 John Oxford, director of Corporate Communication for Renasant Bank
 David Parker, state senator
 Amanda Tollison, attorney
 Gray Tollison, state senator
 Amy Tuck, former Lieutenant Governor of Mississippi
 Todd Wade, former NFL player

Democratic Party

Declared
 Walter Zinn, attorney and political aide

Declined
 Hob Bryan, state senator
 Travis Childers, former U.S. Representative and nominee for the U.S. Senate in 2014
 Steve Holland, state representative
 Eric Powell, former state senator
 Brandon Presley, Public Service Commissioner and former mayor of Nettleton (ran for re-election)
 Scott Ross, former mayor of West Point
 Jason Shelton, Mayor of Tupelo

Libertarian Party

Did Not File
 Danny Bedwell, businessman and Libertarian nominee for the seat in 2012 and 2014

General election

Predictions

Fundraising

Results

Runoff election

Predictions

Fundraising

Polling

Results

County results

References

External links
Trent Kelly campaign website
Walter Zinn campaign website

United States House of Representatives 1
2015 1
Mississippi 1
Mississippi 2015 1
Mississippi 1
United States House of Representatives 2015 01